Kepal is hamlet under Kondamadugu  village in Nalgonda district in Telangana, India. It is located on National Highway 202. It is popular for its traditional medicine for bone fractures.

References

Villages in Nalgonda district